Carole Simpson (born December 7, 1940) is an American broadcast journalist, news anchor, and author.  She is the first African-American woman to anchor a major United States network newscast.

Education and career 
Simpson, a graduate of the University of Michigan, began her career on radio at WCFL in Chicago, Illinois, and was later hired at WBBM. She moved to television at Chicago's WMAQ and onto NBC News in 1975, becoming the first African-American woman to anchor a major network newscast. She joined ABC News in 1982, and was an anchor for the weekend edition of World News Tonight from 1988 until October 2003.

She became the first woman of color to moderate a presidential debate when she moderated the debate held between George H. W. Bush, Bill Clinton, and Ross Perot, at Richmond, Virginia, in 1992. That same year she was the recipient of the Journalist of the Year Award from the National Association of Black Journalists.

Simpson is on the Advisory Council at the International Women's Media Foundation.

She retired from ABC News in 2006 to begin teaching journalism at Emerson College in Boston, Massachusetts, where she taught until 2019.

Simpson is a former member of the Radio Television Digital News Foundation Board of Trustees, an affiliate of the Radio Television Digital News Association. There, she established the Carole Simpson Scholarship to encourage and help minority students overcome hurdles along their career path, which is offered annually to aspiring journalists.

In 2010, her autobiography, Newslady, was published by AuthorHouse.

Personal life
Simpson is a cousin of sportswriter and ESPN commentator Michael Wilbon.

See also

 List of Emerson College people
 Lists of journalists
 List of people from Chicago
 List of University of Michigan alumni

References

External links

"Interview with Carole Simpson".  Retrieved November 27, 2007.
"Carole Simpson 2008 Schwartz Visiting Fellow".
"Carole Simpson Honored in 1993 with Striving for Excellence Awards" through The Minorities in Broadcasting Training Program

1941 births
Living people
Place of birth missing (living people)
20th-century American journalists
20th-century American biographers
American women biographers
20th-century American educators
20th-century American women writers
21st-century American journalists
21st-century American biographers
21st-century American educators
21st-century American women writers
ABC News personalities
African-American academics
African-American radio personalities
African-American television hosts
African-American women journalists
African-American journalists
American autobiographers
American women academics
Educators from Illinois
Emerson College faculty
Hyde Park Academy High School alumni
NBC News people
Radio personalities from Boston
Radio personalities from Chicago
Television anchors from Boston
Television anchors from Chicago
University of Michigan alumni
Women autobiographers
American women radio journalists
Writers from Boston
Writers from Chicago
American women television journalists
20th-century American women educators
21st-century American women educators
20th-century African-American women
20th-century African-American people
20th-century African-American educators
21st-century African-American women
21st-century African-American people